LPW could refer to:

 Lapworth railway station, England; National Rail station code LPW.
 Lumen per watt (better expressed in standard unit symbols as lm/W)